Spencer Gorge/Webster's Falls Conservation Area is located on the Niagara Escarpment in Dundas, Ontario, a constituent community of Hamilton, Ontario, and is owned and operated by the Hamilton Conservation Authority. It has views over Hamilton and a two major waterfalls that are accessible via a system of trails. The natural features found in the area are considered to be provincially significant. A shuttle service runs from Christie Lake Conservation Area to Spencer Gorge/Webster Falls Conservation Area, for visitors to access this conservation area on weekends and holidays.

Geology
The walls of the gorge are very steep, contrasting the gently sloping landscape found in the nearby areas. The gorge was incised by the melt streams of the Wisconsin glaciation about 10,000 years ago. The gorge displays a near-complete stratigraphic section from the red shales of the Queenston Formation to the caprock of the Lockport Formation (dolomite and limestone).

Waterfalls

Measuring  in height, Tew's Falls is the tallest waterfall found in Hamilton, among 96 others. 
Webster's Falls is another major waterfall. With its  crest, it is the largest within the city.
 The gorge is an excellent example of the process of waterfall recession. At least 10 bowl-shaped basins have been identified within the area, indicating the earlier positions of the waterfall.

See also
List of waterfalls in Hamilton, Ontario

References

External links

 Hamilton- "The Waterfall Capital of the World" (www.cityofwaterfalls.ca)
 Spencer Gorge/Webster's Falls Conservation Area 
 Map: Hamilton Waterfalls (www.hamiltonnature.org)
 Vintage Postcards: Waterfalls in and around Hamilton, Ontario

Conservation areas in Ontario
Waterfalls of Hamilton, Ontario
Niagara Escarpment
Protected areas of Hamilton, Ontario
Protected areas established in 1967
1967 establishments in Ontario